Rebeca Antonieta Ghigliotto Villar (18 January 1954 – 20 September 2003) was a Chilean actress of stage plays and television series, or telenovelas. She had three daughters with director Raúl Osorio: Camila, Javiera, and Luciana Osorio Ghigliotto. Ghigliotto died of lung cancer.

Performances
The Puppet (1984)
Paper Marriage (1985) 
Bad Angel (1986)
The Invitation (1987) 
Demigod (1988)
They by them (1991)
Love at home (1995)
Adrenaline (1996) 
Out of Control (1999)

References

External links
IMDB page

1954 births
2003 deaths
Chilean stage actresses
Chilean women comedians
Chilean television actresses
Chilean telenovela actresses
University of Chile alumni
20th-century comedians